Ron Stallworth (born June 18, 1953) is an American retired police officer who infiltrated the ranks of the Ku Klux Klan in Colorado Springs, Colorado, in the late 1970s. He was the first African-American detective in the Colorado Springs Police Department.

In the 2018 film BlacKkKlansman, which is based on his experience infiltrating the Ku Klux Klan, Stallworth is portrayed by John David Washington.

Early life 
Ron Stallworth was born in Chicago, Illinois, on June 18, 1953, and raised in El Paso, Texas, after his mother moved the family there. According to a statement in his book, he said "My mother moving our family to El Paso was the best decision she ever made, as it was a far cry from the poverty, gangs, and conflict in the city's South Side, where I would have come of age if she had not left."

Stallworth graduated from Austin High School in 1971, where he was both a member of the student council, and of a district-wide advisory board; he was also voted "most popular".

Colorado Springs Police Department
In mid-1972, Stallworth's family moved to Colorado Springs, where he first took an interest in a career in law enforcement. He joined the department as a cadet in November of that year, becoming first black cadet in the Colorado Springs Police Department.

According to Stallworth himself, he knew, even as a cadet, that he eventually wanted to work as an undercover police officer.  His first undercover assignment came when Kwame Ture was invited to speak at a Colorado Springs nightclub with a black clientele. Stallworth was asked if he would go undercover to observe the speech, and he eagerly accepted the assignment, being subsequently assigned to the intelligence section of his department.

Infiltration of the Klan 
In 1978, Stallworth noticed a classified ad in the local paper seeking members to start a new chapter of the Ku Klux Klan in the city. He responded to the posting via mail to a P.O. box, and provided them an address and phone number. A Klan member phoned Stallworth, who then posed as a racist white man who "hated Blacks, Jews, Mexicans, Asians". During the conversation, he learned that the man founding the new chapter was a soldier at nearby Fort Carson. Stallworth arranged to meet the man at a local bar and sent a white undercover narcotics officer to stand in for him at the meeting, wired to record any conversations.

The subterfuge was a success, and Stallworth continued to pose as a Klan member for the next nine months, usually talking on the phone with other members and sending the white officer in his place when face-to-face meetings were necessary. Stallworth phoned David Duke, who was the Klan's Grand Wizard at the time, at his headquarters in New Orleans to ask about the status of his membership application. Duke apologized for the delay in getting the application processed and promised to see to it personally that Stallworth's application was processed and sent to him. Within a short time, Stallworth's Klan certificate of membership arrived in the mail with Duke's signature. He framed the certificate and hung it on his office wall, where it stayed for years.

Retirement, public appearances and pop culture 
After the investigation into the Klan closed, Stallworth kept it a secret and told no one about his role in it. He transferred to the Utah Department of Public Safety, where he retired in 2005 after working as an investigator for nearly 20 years. After retirement he earned a bachelor's degree in criminal justice from Missouri's Columbia College's Salt Lake City Campus in 2007.

In January 2006, Stallworth gave an interview to Salt Lake City's Deseret News in which he described his infiltration and investigation of the Klan and later disclosed that the investigation revealed several members were on active duty with the U.S. Armed Forces, including two individuals posted at NORAD (the North American Aerospace Defense Command, which provides aerospace warning, air sovereignty, and protection for Northern America). The two members at NORAD were reassigned and Stallworth was told that they were given remote postings, "somewhere like the North Pole or Greenland". 

In 2014, Stallworth published a book titled Black Klansman about his investigative experience. For his source material, he used a casebook that he assembled during the assignment and later kept for himself after it was over. The book was taken to QC Entertainment by producer Shaun Redick to make a film based on it called BlacKkKlansman. Spike Lee signed on as director, co-producer, and co-screenwriter while Jordan Peele signed on as producer. Stallworth was represented by manager Andrew Frances of Adwater & Stir. The film was released nationwide on August 10, 2018 and in select theaters two weeks earlier, with John David Washington as Stallworth, Adam Driver as white undercover officer Flip Zimmerman, and Topher Grace as David Duke alongside Laura Harrier, Ryan Eggold, Corey Hawkins, Alec Baldwin, and Harry Belafonte. BlacKkKlansman won the Grand Prize of the Jury at the Cannes Film Festival and was also nominated for six Academy Awards, winning for Best Adapted Screenplay.

References

External links
 

1953 births
Living people
People from Chicago
People from El Paso, Texas
African-American police officers
American municipal police officers
Undercover police agents
African-American writers
African-American history of Colorado
Ku Klux Klan
Columbia College (Missouri) alumni
20th-century African-American people
21st-century African-American people
21st-century African-American writers